The list of shipwrecks in August 1826 includes ships sunk, foundered, grounded, or otherwise lost during August 1826.

1 August

5 August

6 August

7 August

8 August

10 August

12 August

14 August

15 August

20 August

22 August

24 August

25 August

26 August

27 August

28 August

30 August

Unknown date

References

1826-08